Racers Track Club is a sprint training group located at 3 Port of Spain Drive, University of the West Indies, Mona, Kingston, Jamaica. It was established by Glen Mills with the stated aim of producing a greater number of world champions than any other track club. The club is known for training some of the world's best sprinters, world champions  currently training with the group include Usain Bolt and Yohan Blake.

Current athletes 
Athletes currently training with Racers Track Club include:

Men

 Kemar Bailey-Cole
 Yohan Blake
 Daniel Bailey
 Miguel Francis
 Michael Frater
 Jason Young
 Zharnel Hughes
 Jevaughn Minzie
 Kimmari Roach
 Warren Weir
 Delano Williams
  Usain Bolt
 Yohan Blake

Women
 Schillonie Calvert
 Kerron Stewart
 Rosemarie Whyte

Current staff
 Glen Mills, Head Coach & Director
 Patrick Dawson, Technical Director

References

External links

Sports teams in Jamaica